Electric Rock Music is the third album, and major-label debut, by Cincinnati-based rock band Ass Ponys. It was released in 1994 on A&M Records. It was produced by John Curley of the Afghan Whigs, at whose Ultrasuede Studio the album was recorded. The band was planning to self-release the album after they recorded it, but then they landed an unexpected deal with A&M when Jeff Suhy, one of the label's representatives, called the band's frontman, Chuck Cleaver on the phone. Suhy told Cleaver that he had pitched a recording of the album to A&M executives, and that they had approved it for release.

Critical reception

Ted Simons of the Phoenix New Times described Electric Rock Music as "an engaging collection of episodes and observations put to song." The Chicago Tribunes Rick Reger described the album as "excellent", and as far better as a whole than its well-known single, "Little Bastard." In contrast, the Washington Posts Mark Jenkins wrote that "Most of the album's songs are crisp and shapely, though there's no other track that's so exuberantly tuneful [as "Little Bastard"]." Jason Cohen of Spin wrote that "with Electric Rock Music, the band has made the album of its life." Also in Spin, Jay Stowe called the album a "bright, shining light."

Track listing
	Grim – 4:31
	Little Bastard –	2:42
	Ape Hanger –	3:22
	Place Out There –	2:58
	Lake Brenda –	3:40
	Wall Eyed Girl –	2:48
	Peanut 93 –	2:40
	Live Until I Die –	3:11
	Banlon Shirt –	5:20
	Gypped –	2:18
	Blushing Bride –	2:11
	Earth To Grandma –	2:52
	Otter Slide –	3:46

Personnel
Ass Ponys – primary artist, producer
Randy Cheek –	bass, background vocals
Chuck Cleaver – guitar, vocals
John Curley –	engineer, producer
John Erhardt –	guitar, pedal steel, slide guitar
Steve Girton –	engineer
David Morrison – drums, organ
Sunja Park –	art direction
Alan Yoshida –	mastering

References

Ass Ponys albums
A&M Records albums
1994 albums